North Eastrington railway station was a station on the Hull and Barnsley Railway, and served the village of Eastrington in the East Riding of Yorkshire, England.

It opened on 27 July 1885 as Eastrington and was renamed North Eastrington on 1 July 1922. It closed on 1 August 1955.

References

External links
 North Eastrington station on navigable 1947 O. S. map

Disused railway stations in the East Riding of Yorkshire
Railway stations in Great Britain opened in 1885
Railway stations in Great Britain closed in 1955
Former Hull and Barnsley Railway stations